Denise Andrea Pesantes Tenorio (born 14 January 1988) is an Ecuadorian professional footballer. She was part of the Ecuadorian squad for the 2015 FIFA Women's World Cup.

International career
Pesantes represented Ecuador at the 2004 South American U-19 Women's Championship.

References

External links
 
 Profile  at FEF
 

1988 births
Living people
Ecuadorian women's footballers
Ecuador women's international footballers
2015 FIFA Women's World Cup players
People from Galápagos Province
Women's association football forwards
Footballers at the 2015 Pan American Games
Pan American Games competitors for Ecuador
21st-century Ecuadorian women